Maharaja Agrasen College accredited with  NAAC `A` Grade is a college of the University of Delhi, located in Vasundhara Enclave (East Delhi), National Capital Region of Delhi.

History

Maharaja Agrasen College was established in 1994 with the objective of catering to the educational requirements of a densely populated East Delhi. The college is fully funded by the Government of India. The college has now shifted to its modern and spacious building complex covering  in Vasundhara Enclave, Delhi. It includes an auditorium, a computer centre, fully computerized library, laboratories, and a conference hall. The new building complex has acquired several new facilities like an Information and Communication Technology Center, a Language Laboratory, a Media Laboratory, an Indira Gandhi Open University Center, and a University Grants Commission Research Center among others. The college also provides residential facilities for girl students.

Academics

Academic programs
The College offers admission to the following courses :

Undergraduate programs 
                                                                                                                       
In 2013, Maharaja Agrasen College, as a constituent college of the University of Delhi, introduced a four-year undergraduate programme but in 2014, FYUP rolled back and Now College provides these Undergraduate Programs:

Bachelor of Arts (B.A.)
Bachelor's in Business Economics 
Bachelor's of Arts (Programme)
Bachelor’s in Journalism
Bachelor's in Hindi
Bachelor's in Economics 
Bachelor's  in English
Bachelor's in Political Science

Bachelor of Science (B.Sc)
Bachelor's with Mathematical science
Bachelor's with Physical Science in Computer Science and chemistry

Bachelor's with Electronics Honours

Bachelor of Commerce (B.Com)

Bachelor's with Honors in Commerce

Bachelor of Technology (B.Tech) AICTE Approved
[Formerly till 2014,currently not available]
Bachelor's of Technology in Computer Science[Formerly till 2014,currently not available] 
Bachelor's of Technology in Electronics[Formerly till 2014,currently not available]

Rankings 
It is ranked 45th across india by National Institutional Ranking Framework in 2020.

Publications

 Indian Journal of Social Enquiry is the quarterly interdisciplinary journal of the college
 Agranika is the annual magazine of the college
 Macroscope is the monthly newsletter of the Dept. of Journalism of the college
 Agrasar is the magazine of NSS unit at Maharaja Agrasen College
 BEAM  is the magazine of business economics and management studies department of college

Recent achievements
Macinterns, the Internship Cell of College was set up in 2016 and since then it has been able to provide students with excellent internships through its internship drives both online and on campus, the last internship fair in April 2017 saw 15 companies coming up and offering numerous positions to the students.

Inquizitive, the Quiz Society of the college, was set up in 2017 and hosted 11 quizzes that year which was the most for any quiz society in the Delhi Quiz Circuit. It hosts the Annual Quiz Competition, the Maharaja Quiz in October.

In 2013, Maharaja Agrasen College was awarded with the Best College Award by the University of Delhi for its good practices towards creating the best academic environment amongst all the colleges of the University. The Award was given by the Secretary, Ministry of Human Resource Development, Government of India, on 24 February 2013, in the presence of Vice-Chancellor, University of Delhi, Dinesh Singh. In the same event i.e. 'Antardhvani'. In 2014, it again won second position in ANTARDHVANI.

Notable alumni 

Shanky Singh, Professional wrestler
Anshul Tewari, Founder of Youth ki awaz
Varun Singh Bhati, Para high jumper
Geetanjali Babbar, founder and director of Kat-Katha organization
 Gaurav Kapoor, Stand Up comedian

References

External links
Official Website

Universities and colleges in Delhi
Memorials to Agrasen
1994 establishments in Delhi
Educational institutions established in 1994